The Vladimir Zhirinovsky 2012 presidential campaign was the election campaign of Liberal Democratic Party leader Vladimir Zhirinovsky in the 2012 election.

Campaigning

On the last episode of debates with Prokhorov, just before the elections, Zhirinovsky caused a scandal by the Russian celebrities that supported Prokhorov, including a pop-diva and a veteran of Russian pop scene Alla Pugacheva, "prostitutes". Pugacheva had responded to those remarks by saying, "I thought you are an artful person, politician, cunning man, but you are just a clown and a psycho". Zhirinovsky retorted by declaring, "I am what I am. And such is my charm."

Donkey video

A video advertisement released by the campaign received significant attention.

Platform

See also
Vladimir Zhirinovsky 1991 presidential campaign
Vladimir Zhirinovsky 1996 presidential campaign
Vladimir Zhirinovsky 2000 presidential campaign
Vladimir Zhirinovsky 2008 presidential campaign
Vladimir Zhirinovsky 2018 presidential campaign

References

 
Zhirinovsky
presidential campaign, 2012